Thera was a town of Ancient Caria. It is mentioned by Arrian as one of the towns held by Orontobates.

Its site is located near Yerkesik, Muğla Province, Asiatic Turkey.

Archaeology 
In July 2022, archaeologists led by Prof. Dr. Abdulkadir Baran from Muğla Sıtkı Koçman University announced the discovery of hellenistic theater in Thera dates to the 2nd century BC.

References

Populated places in ancient Caria
Former populated places in Turkey